The Ukrainian Congress Committee of America or UCCA is a non-partisan non-profit national umbrella organization uniting over 20 national Ukrainian American organizations in advocating for over 1,000,000 Americans of Ukrainian descent. Its membership is composed of fraternal, educational, veterans, religious, cultural, social, business, political and humanitarian organizations, as well as individuals. Established in 1940, the UCCA maintains local volunteer chapters across the United States, with a national office based in New York City, as well as a Washington, D.C. news bureau, the Ukrainian National Information Service. The humanitarian aid committee, the United Ukrainian American Relief Committee, is headquartered in Philadelphia, Pennsylvania.

The UCCA is a founding member of the Ukrainian World Congress (UWC), the international assembly of nearly all Ukrainian public organizations in the worldwide Ukrainian diaspora of over 20 million people. In the United States, the UCCA is a member organization of the Central and East European Coalition (CEEC), which coordinates the efforts of national ethnic organizations representing 20 million Americans, whose members continue to maintain strong cultural, economic, political, and religious ties to the countries of Central and East Europe.

The UCCA convenes a "Congress of Ukrainians in America" quadrennially (from 1940–1969, triennially), composed of delegates representing registered national organizations, UCCA member organizations and local UCCA chapters. The most recent Congress convened in Hartford, Connecticut in September 2016.

Organizational structure

During the periods between each quadrennial Congress of Ukrainians in America, elected committees carry out the directives of the previous Congress under the guidance of a National Executive Board, appointed at the previous Congress. The National Executive Board, in turn, executes the plans and directives of UCCA's National Council, the highest ruling body of the UCCA.

UCCA's National Council meets biannually, and is composed of delegates representing Ukrainian churches and religious associations, Ukrainian educational institutions, national or central member organizations, and local UCCA chapters.

Current member organizations of the National Council include:
 Center for US-Ukrainian Relations (CUSUR)
 Council on Aid to Ukrainians (RODU)
 Educational Council of UCCA
 Federation of Ukrainian Student Organizations of America (SUSTA)
 Heritage Foundation Of First Security Federal Savings Bank ("Спадщина")
 Manor College
 New Ukrainian Wave
 Organization for Defense of Four Freedoms for Ukraine (ODFFU)
 Organization for Defense of Lemkivshchyna (OOL)
 Organization for the Rebirth of Ukraine (ODWU)
Providence Association of Ukrainian Catholics in America
 "Self-Reliance" Association of American Ukrainians ("Самопоміч")
 Society of the Ukrainian Insurgent Army (UPA) 
 The Ukrainian Quarterly
 Ukrainian American Bar Association (UABA)
 Ukrainian American Freedom Foundation (UAFF)
 Ukrainian American Veterans (UAV)
 Ukrainian American Youth Association (UAYA/SUMA/CYM)
 Ukrainian Catholic Metropolitan of Philadelphia
 Ukrainian Free University Foundation
 Ukrainian Gift of Life
 Ukrainian Human Rights Committee
 Ukrainian Medical Association of North America (UMANA/УЛТПА)
 Ukrainian National Association (UNA)
 Ukrainian National Credit Union Association (UNCUA/ЦУКА)
 Ukrainian National Information Service (UNIS)
 Ukrainian Orthodox Church of the USA
 United Ukrainian American Relief Committee (UUARC)
 Women's Association for the Defense of Four Freedoms for Ukraine

Local chapters are spread over the United States, with the most active in the following cities: Atlanta, GA, Amsterdam, NY, Binghamton, NY, Boston, MA, Bridgeport, CT, Buffalo, NY, Chicago, IL, Cleveland, OH, Hartford, CT, Jersey City, NJ, Kerhonkson, NY, Long Island, NY, Los Angeles, CA, Newark, NJ, New Britain, CT, New Haven, CT, New York City, North Port, FL, Passaic, NJ,  Philadelphia, PA, Riverhead, NY, Rochester, NY, Syracuse, NY, and Yonkers, NY.

United Ukrainian American Relief Committee
The United Ukrainian American Relief Committee (UUARC) was established at the Second Congress of Americans of Ukrainian Descent in 1944. Organized to coordinate humanitarian aid for Ukrainian war victims and refugees, its mandate also focuses on educational and sustainable land programs overseas, and immigrant assistance programs in the U.S. The UUARC is headquartered in Philadelphia, PA.

Ukrainian National Information Service
The Ukrainian National Information Service (UNIS) is the UCCA's permanent Washington, D.C.-based bureau. Founded in 1977 to strengthen the work of the Ukrainian American community in American governmental circles, UNIS originally operated out of offices leased from the Heritage Foundation prior to the purchase of a permanent home in 2000. When engaged with members of the United States Congress, the UNIS cooperates with the Congressional Ukrainian Caucus and the Senate Ukraine Caucus.

Formation and gatherings

Prior to the gathering of the "First Ukrainian American Congress" on May 24, 1940, pre-war émigrés from Ukraine had first attempted to unite under the "Union of Ukrainian Organizations," which by 1939 had attempted to call for a formal representative body of Ukrainians in America. By February 1940, the four largest national [fraternal organizations had taken over the initiative of convoking an "All-Ukrainian National Congress," namely the Ukrainian National Association (UNA), the Providence Association of Ukrainian Catholics in America, the Ukrainian Workingmen's Association, and the Ukrainian National Aid Association.

First Ukrainian American Congress

804 delegates from 168 different localities, as well as over 200 invited guests, gathered at the historic Washington Hotel in Washington, D.C. on May 24, 1940. In addition to those representing the large fraternal organizations who initiated the gathering, delegates in attendance represented the Organization for the Rebirth of Ukraine (ODWU), the Ukrainian National Women's League of America, the Association of Ukrainian Sich Riflemen, Ukrainian American Veterans, Ukrainian Catholic parishes and brotherhoods, Ukrainian Orthodox parishes and brotherhoods, the Association of Greek-Catholic Ruthenian Brotherhoods, political associations, various Ukrainian American Clubs, National Homes, political clubs, choir associations, dance and drama clubs, and others. Delegates travelled from the states of New York, New Jersey, Pennsylvania, Connecticut, Massachusetts, Rhode Island, Delaware, Maryland, West Virginia, Ohio, Illinois, Michigan, Minnesota, Missouri, and California.

At the time of the first Congress, the Soviet Union was still months away from being expelled from the League of Nations for colluding with Hitler and invading Finland, and President Franklin D. Roosevelt had yet to order a massive modernization of the United States Navy. Pro-communist and Russophile propagandists actively sought to negate the claims of Ukrainian nationalists calling for support of an independent Ukraine.

The physical gathering of delegates took place over the course of a single day, with speeches and appearances by US legislators taking precedence over formal elections. Speakers included then-House Majority Whip Representative Patrick J. Boland (D-PA), then-Dean of the United States House of Representatives Rep. Adolph J. Sabath (D-IL), Senator Joseph F. Guffey (D-PA), Sen. James J. Davis (R-PA), Sen. Francis T. Maloney (D-CT), Rep. J. Harold Flannery (D-PA), Rep. Lewis K. Rockefeller (R-NY), Rep. Jerry Voorhis (D-CA), Rep. Francis E. Walter (D-PA), and Rep. Caroline O'Day (D-NY), the first woman Democrat elected to Congress. Presentations were given on topics including "To What Extent Ukrainians Have Contributed to the Cultural And Material Development of America," "The Economic Foundations of an Independent Ukraine," "Our Assistance To Ukraine," and others. The work of hundreds of organizers preceded the Washington gathering, and a widely published editorial was released to coincide with the meeting, entitled, "Ukrainians Prepare For Independence."

At the conclusion of the Congress, a gala concert was performed featuring a Ukrainian Chorus under the direction of renowned Ukrainian maestro Alexander Koshetz. Adorned in vyshyvanka and Ukrainian wreaths, the singers performed stirring renditions of the Ukrainian anthem Shche ne vmerla Ukraina and the Star-Spangled Banner. Artists such as the soprano Maria Hrebenetska added to the gala with performances of works by Mykola Lysenko and more contemporary works.

In the year following this first congress, Nazi Germany would invade Ukraine, and Japan would attack Pearl Harbor. While the US had resisted involvement in the war during the first Ukrainian Congress, by January 1944, the Allied powers had already begun plans for major counteroffensives.

II Congress

The "Second Congress of Americans of Ukrainian Descent" was held at the Hotel Benjamin Franklin, in Philadelphia, PA, on January 22–23, 1944. With Joseph Stalin now a wartime ally of the United States, following the Nazi invasion of Soviet-occupied Ukraine, Communists and Russophiles, encouraged by their Soviet leaders and agencies, sought to vilify American Ukrainians in America wherever they could. Anti-Ukrainian propaganda even extended to American press and broadcasts, including the radio editorials of Walter Winchell. Anti-Ukrainian books such as Sabotage! The Secret War Against America (1942), by Albert E. Kahn and Michael Sayers accused Ukrainian immigrants of conspiring against the United States. This hostile atmosphere made planning for another national gathering difficult for Ukrainian-Americans, especially with wartime travel restrictions in place.

Without any U.S. government officials attending, 235 delegates voted on an ambitious program of activity to support both the United States and Ukraine's continuing struggle for independence. The second Congress approved an American-Ukrainian war bond drive, the establishment of United Ukrainian American Relief Committee for Ukrainian war victims and refugees, and the publication of the only English-language scholarly journal on Ukraine for its time – The Ukrainian Quarterly.

III Congress
At the close of the war, a delegation of Ukrainian-American representatives which had been elected at the second Congress in 1944, flew to San Francisco to advocate on behalf of a free Ukraine during the formation of the United Nations, convening at the Conference on International Organization in May 1945. Contrary to the hopes of the UCCA delegates, Soviet-occupied Ukraine was officially recognized as a member state of the United Nations in June 1945.

In light of the developments at the United Nations, Ukrainian-Americans gathered again in Washington, DC, at the Almas Temple on May 31, 1946. At the "Third Congress of Americans of Ukrainian Descent," a unified national platform was agreed upon, supporting a non-isolationist U.S. foreign policy, to confront an emergent "totalitarian-imperialistic U.S.S.R." Furthermore, the ideals incorporated into the 1941 Atlantic Charter as delineated by President Roosevelt and Prime Minister Churchill, were formally embraced by the delegates at the third Congress, as well as President Roosevelt's goals of Freedom of speech, Freedom of Worship, Freedom from Want, and Freedom from fear; otherwise referred to as the "Four Freedoms." As with the second Congress, there were no elected US officials in attendance at the third Congress, although Fred Zaplitny, a member of the Canadian House of Commons did attend and delivered greetings from his fellow Ukrainian Canadians.

Following the third Congress, UCCA chairman Stephan Shumeyko flew to the Paris Peace Conference, delivering UCCA memorandums to delegations representing governments across the world. As the Western Allied countries would begin to wind down their sponsorship of Displaced Person (DP) zones in Europe, the UCCA would focus its attention on the million displaced persons in Europe, more than half of whom were in the U.S. Zone. The newly formed United Ukrainian American Relief Committee (founded at the second Congress) coordinated Ukrainian American efforts towards the enactment of the Displaced Persons Act of 1948, providing for more than 200,000 DPs to enter the US over the next two years, 85,000 of whom were Ukrainians.

IV Congress

Between 1938 and 1952, the United Ukrainian American Relief Committee assisted in the immigration of over 33,000 displaced Ukrainian refugees to the United States; sponsorship by additional charities more than doubled the number of new Ukrainian immigrants into the diaspora. Whereas earlier waves of Ukrainian immigration fled from poverty and arrived mostly illiterate, the political refugees driven out of their country by the recent war and persecution had on average a decade of education, while many were college graduates and professionals. These newer arrivals brought with them the organizational mindset which led to the flourishing of organizations such as the Ukrainian American Youth Association, the Federation of Ukrainian Student Organizations of America, the Organization of Democratic Ukrainian Youth, and the Shevchenko Scientific Society. In 1947, a Pan-American Ukrainian Conference was organized for the first time, uniting the organizing efforts of the UCCA, the Ukrainian Canadian Congress, the Ukrainian Central Representation in Argentina and the Society of Friends of Ukrainian Culture in Brazil.

Representatives of this new wave of immigrants participated at the gathering of the "Fourth Congress of Americans of Ukrainian Descent," which took place from November 5–6, 1949, again at the Almas Temple in Washington, D.C. The newer immigrants presented reports on the state of displaced Ukrainians scattered throughout Europe, as well as read greetings from Ukrainian leaders in Eastern Ukraine, Western Ukraine, Carpathian Ukraine and other regions. 

Unlike the II and III Congresses, the IV Congress saw the return of US government officials paying attention to the organized Ukrainian diaspora, beginning with the first Presidential greeting sent to a Ukraine Congress, from newly re-elected President Harry S. Truman. Senator H. Alexander Smith told the 368 delegates, representing some 472 different organizations, that it was the great privilege and responsibility of the United States to lead and assist in Ukraine's efforts to "throw off the shackles of imperialism," and hailed the "grim determination of courageous individuals to secure their freedom rather than yield to the tempting allurements of fascist-nazism or communist-marxism." Also addressing the delegates, was Under Secretary of State Herbert A. Fierst, as well as Edward J. Shaughnessy, director of the Immigration and Naturalization Service, New York, who urged Ukrainians to share the truth about life outside the Iron Curtain with their friends and family who remained in Europe.

V Congress

The "Fifth Congress of Americans of Ukrainian Descent" was held on July 4–6, 1952, at the Hotel Statler in New York City. The first of many Congresses to take place in New York City, the event was the most well attended with nearly 1,500 delegates and guests in attendance, generating plenty of interest from the New York press. The Cold War with the Soviets had by then begun in earnest, ensnaring the United States military in another campaign – the Korean War. The Mutual Security Act of 1951 launched a new era of American Foreign Aid, and more pressingly for an immigrant population, Congress had recently enacted the Immigration and Nationality Act of 1952 over the veto of President Truman, which changed the quota systems that determined which ethnic groups were 'desirable immigrants.'

Addressing the delegates, the Secretary of the Interior, Oscar L. Chapman, remarked, "The Ukrainian tradition is completely in harmony with the American tradition. A thousand years ago, before the existence of the North American continent was known, the great Kingdom of Kiev was the political and cultural creation of the Ukrainian people, the easternmost bastion of Western culture. Still later, the rising princes of Moscovy came to assert their mastery. The independence of Kiev vanished, and there began a long period of foreign rule, which unhappily exists to this day. But at the heart of the Ukrainian tradition lies the significant fact that although political independence was destroyed, the great desire for independence did not die."

Retired Admiral and recent U.S. Ambassador to the Soviet Union, Alan Goodrich Kirk, also spoke at the Congress.

VI Congress

The 6th "Congress of Americans of Ukrainian Descent" took place in the Hotel Commodore in New York City, from the May 28 to 30, 1955.

VII Congress

The VII "Congress of Americans of Ukrainian Descent" gathered on February 21–23, 1959, at the Hotel Statler Hilton, in Washington, DC.

VIII Congress

The "Eighth Congress of Americans of Ukrainian Descent" gathered on October 12–14, 1962, at the Hotel Commodore, in New York City.

IX Congress

The "Ninth Congress of Americans of Ukrainian Descent" gathered on October 7–9, 1966, at the New York Hilton Hotel, in New York City.

X Congress

The "Tenth Congress of Ukrainians in the U.S.A." gathered on October 24–26, 1969, at the Commodore Hotel, in New York City.
https://www.ukrweekly.com/archive/1969/The_Ukrainian_Weekly_1969-37.pdf

XI Congress

The "Eleventh Congress of Ukrainians in the U.S.A." gathered on October 6–8, 1972, at the Hotel Commodore, in New York City.

XII Congress

The "Twelfth Congress of Ukrainians in the U.S.A." gathered on October 8–10, 1976, at the Americana Hotel, in New York City.

XIII Congress

The "Thirteenth Congress of Ukrainians in the U.S.A." gathered on October 10–12, 1980, at the Hotel Benjamin Franklin, in Philadelphia.

XIV Congress

The "Fourteenth Congress of Ukrainians in the U.S.A." gathered on November 23–25, 1984, at the Hotel Waldorf Astoria, in New York City.

XV Congress

The "Fifteenth Congress of Ukrainians in the USA" gathered on September 16–18, 1988, at the L'Enfant Plaza Hotel, in Washington, DC.

XVI Congress

The "Sixteenth Congress of Ukrainians in America" gathered on October 16–18, 1992, at the Ramada Hotel in East Hanover, NJ.

XVII Congress

The "Seventeenth Congress of Ukrainians in America" gathered on October 18–20, 1996, at the Ramada Hotel in East Hanover, NJ.

XVIII Congress

The "Eighteenth Congress of Ukrainians in America" gathered on October 13–15, 2000, at the Chicago Marriott O'Hare in Chicago, IL.

XIX Congress

The "Nineteenth Congress of Ukrainians in America" gathered on September 24–26, 2004, at the Crowne Plaza Hotel in Philadelphia, PA.

XX Congress

The "Twentieth Congress of Ukrainians in America" gathered on October 17–19, 2008, at the Sheraton Cleveland Airport Hotel in Cleveland, OH.

XXI Congress

The "Twenty-First Congress of Ukrainians in America" gathered on September 28–30, 2012, at the Ukrainian Youth Center in Yonkers, NY.

XXII Congress

The "Twenty-Second Congress of Ukrainians in America" gathered on September 23–25, 2016, at the Ukrainian National Home in Hartford, CT.

See also
 Ukraine–United States relations
 Senate Ukraine Caucus
 Congressional Ukrainian Caucus
 Ukrainian World Congress
 Ukrainian diaspora
 Ukrainian Americans
 Ukrainian American Coordinating Council
 The Federation of Ukrainian Student Organizations of America (SUSTA)
 Ukrainian National Women's League of America
 Ukrainian Catholic Archeparchy of Philadelphia
 Ukrainian Orthodox Church of the USA
 List of Ukrainian enclaves in North American cities
 Ukrainian Americans in New York City
 Ukrainian Americans in Los Angeles
 Ukrainian Village, Chicago
 Ukrainian Association of Washington State
 History of the Ukrainians in Baltimore
 Razom
 Crimean Tatar diaspora
 Joint Baltic American National Committee
 Polish American Congress
 Belarusian Congress Committee of America

References

External links
 Official Website – UCCA
 Facebook page – UCCA
 UCCA – 70 Years of Service in the Ukrainian American Community (VIDEO)
 Official Website – Ukrainian World Congress
 Official Website – Central and East European Coalition
 Ukrainian diaspora in Canada and U.S.

American people of Ukrainian descent
European-American society
Ukrainian American
Organizations established in 1940
Ukrainian-American culture
Ukrainian-American history
Ukrainian diaspora organizations